Sopota is a settlement south of Podkum in the Municipality of Zagorje ob Savi in central Slovenia. The area is part of the traditional region of Lower Carniola. It is now included with the rest of the municipality in the Central Sava Statistical Region.

History
Sopota was a hamlet of Podkum until 1999, when it was separated from it and made a separate village.

References

External links
Sopota on Geopedia

Populated places in the Municipality of Zagorje ob Savi